The Western Sudetes are a geomorphological macroregion, the western part of the Sudetes subprovince on the borders of the Czech Republic, Poland and Germany. They are formed mostly by mountain ranges. They stretches from the Bóbr river in the east to the Elbe and the Elbe Sandstone Mountains in the west.

Divisions
The Western Sudetes are further divided into mesoregions (number indicates its location on the infobox map):
1 – West Lusatian Hill Country and Uplands
2 – Upper Lusatian Gefilde
3 – Lusatian Highlands
4 – Zittau Basin
5 – Lusatian Mountains (including the Zittau Mountains)
6 – Izerskie Foothills
7 – Jizera Mountains
8 – Ještěd–Kozákov Ridge
9 – Kaczawskie Foothills
10 – Kaczawskie Mountains
11 – Jelenia Góra Valley
12 – Rudawy Janowickie
13 – Giant Mountains
14 – Giant Mountains Foothills
15 – Waldenburg Mountains

References

Sudetes
Mountain ranges of Saxony